Julien may refer to:

People 
 Julien (given name)
 Julien (surname)

Music 
 Julien (opera), a 1913 poème lyrique by Gustave Charpentier
 Julien (album), by Dalida, 1973
 "Julien" (song), by Carly Rae Jepsen, 2019

Places

United States 
 Julien's Auctions, an auction house in Los Angeles, California
 Julien's Restorator (ca.1793-1823), a restaurant in Boston, Massachusetts
 Julien Hall (Boston), a building built in 1825 in Boston, Massachusetts
 Brasserie Julien, an American restaurant in New York City

Elsewhere 
 Julien Day School, a co-educational primary, secondary and senior secondary school in Kolkata, West Bengal, India
 Julien Inc., a Canadian stainless steel fabrication company
 Camp Julien, the main base for the Canadian contingent of the International Security Assistance Force in Kabul, Afghanistan
 Fort Julien, a fort in Egypt originally built by the Ottoman Empire and occupied by the French
 Pont Julien, a Roman stone arch bridge over the Calavon river in the south-east of France

Other uses 
 a French adjective meaning related to Julius Caesar
 Automobiles Julien, a former French automobile manufacturer

See also 
 Julian (disambiguation)
 Saint-Julien (disambiguation)